The following elections occurred in the year 1922.

 1922 Cardinal electors in Papal conclave
 1922 Papal conclave

Africa
 1922 Southern Rhodesian government referendum

Asia
 1922 Philippine House of Representatives elections
 1922 Philippine Senate elections
 1922 Philippine legislative election

Europe
 1922 Dutch general election
 1922 Finnish parliamentary election
 Hungarian parliamentary election 
 1922 Irish general election
 1922 Lithuanian parliamentary election
 1922 Republic of Central Lithuania general election
 1922 Luxembourgian legislative election
 1922 Norwegian local elections
 1922 Polish legislative election
 1922 Portuguese legislative election
 1922 Swedish prohibition referendum
 United Kingdom:
 general election
 1922 Banbury by-election
 1922 Bodmin by-election
 1922 Cambridge by-election
 1922 City of London by-election
 1922 Inverness by-election
 1922 Labour Party leadership election (UK)
 List of MPs elected in the 1922 United Kingdom general election
 1922 Manchester Clayton by-election
 1922 Moray and Nairn by-election
 1922 Newport by-election
 1922 Southwark Borough election
 1922 Wolverhampton West by-election

Americas

Canada
 1922 Edmonton municipal election
 1922 Manitoba general election
 1922 Toronto municipal election
 1922 Yukon general election

United States
 1922 United States House of Representatives elections
 United States House of Representatives elections in California, 1922
 United States House of Representatives elections in South Carolina, 1922
 1922 California gubernatorial election
 1922 Minnesota gubernatorial election
 1922 New York state election
 1922 South Carolina gubernatorial election
 1922 United States Senate elections
 United States Senate election in Massachusetts, 1922

South America  
 1922 Argentine general election
 1922 Brazilian presidential election
 1922 Guatemalan presidential election
 1922 Honduran legislative election
 1922 Nicaraguan parliamentary election

Oceania

Australia
 1922 Australian federal election
 1922 Tasmanian state election

New Zealand
 1922 New Zealand general election
 1922 Dunedin North by-election
 1922 Southern Maori by-election

See also
 :Category:1922 elections

1922
Elections